Dominique Jade Tipper (born 24 June 1988) is a British actress, dancer and singer-songwriter. She rose to prominence in her role as Naomi Nagata,  the engineer in the SyFy/Amazon Prime Video science fiction television series The Expanse.

Early life
Tipper was brought up in Limehouse, East London. As a child, she trained at the O'Farrell Stage and Theatre School and performed in shows at the Hackney Empire.

Career 

Until 2012, Tipper performed as a commercial dancer with musical groups and artists. As a solo musician, she has published the promotional single Superstar, among others.

Tipper's film roles have included as Sarah in the British athletic drama Fast Girls in 2012, as Gabriela in the fantasy comedy horror Vampire Academy  in 2014 and also as Maddie in the Austrian science fiction film MindGamers in 2015. She is best known for her television acting breakthrough in 2015 with her main cast role as Naomi Nagata in the science fiction series ''The Expanse.

Filmography

References

External links

 

Living people
British actresses
British women singer-songwriters
British female dancers
People from Limehouse
British people of Dominica descent
Dancers from London
1988 births